Nihon Go Gakko may refer to:

Nihon Go Gakko (Seattle, Washington), listed on the NRHP in Seattle, Washington
Nihon Go Gakko (Tacoma, Washington), listed on the NRHP in Tacoma, Washington
Nihon Go Gakko (Asunción, Paraguay)